Gabrielle Nance (born 29 July 1994) is a field hockey player from Australia who plays as a forward.

Personal life
Gabrielle Nance was born and raised in Kingscliff, New South Wales.

Nance relocated to Adelaide in 2014 to represent SA in national competitions.

Career

Domestic leagues

Australian Hockey League
In the Australian Hockey League, Nance was a member of the SA Suns. She represented the team from 2014 to 2017.

Hockey One
In 2019, Nance was named in the Adelaide Fire squad for the inaugural tournament of Hockey Australia's new domestic league, Hockey One.

National team
Nance made her debut for the Hockeyroos in 2014 during a test series against New Zealand in Wellington. Following her debut, Nance won her first medal with Australia at the Champions Trophy in Mendoza; the team finished in second place, winning a silver medal.

In 2016, Nance represented her country at the Summer Olympics in Rio de Janeiro.

Following her silver medal-winning appearance at the 2018 Commonwealth Games on the Gold Coast, Nance made the decision to take a break from international hockey to reignite her passion for the game.

Nance returned to the national squad in 2020.

International goals

References

External links
 
 
 

1994 births
Living people
Australian female field hockey players
Field hockey players at the 2016 Summer Olympics
Olympic field hockey players of Australia
Place of birth missing (living people)
Female field hockey forwards
Commonwealth Games medallists in field hockey
Commonwealth Games silver medallists for Australia
Field hockey players at the 2018 Commonwealth Games
21st-century Australian women
Medallists at the 2018 Commonwealth Games